Gaban (literally, Embezzlement) is a Hindi novel by Munshi Premchand, published by Saraswati Press in 1931. Through this novel, he tries to show "the falling moral values among lower middle class Indian youth in the era of British India", and to what heights a person can get to, to reach the world of elite class, and maintain the false image as a rich person.

It tells the story of Ramanath, a handsome, pleasure seeking, boastful, but a morally weak person, who tries to make his wife Jalpa happy by gifting her jewelry which he can't really afford to buy with his meager salary, gets engulfed in a web of debts, which ultimately forces him to commit embezzlement. It is considered Premchand's best work, after Godaan.

It was adapted into a 1966 Hindi film with the same name by Hrishikesh Mukherjee.

References

Bibliography

External links 
 
 Gaban at Hindustan Books

1931 novels
Hindi-language novels
Indian novels adapted into films
Novels by Premchand
Novels set in British India
Oxford University Press books